"Liiku" is a song by Finnish rapper Cheek featuring Jonna. Released in 2005, the song serves as the first single from Cheek's second studio album Käännän sivuu. "Liiku" peaked at number five on the Finnish Singles Chart.

Chart performance

References

2005 singles
Cheek (rapper) songs
2005 songs